75–300mm is a common focal length for camera lenses.  Multiple articles exist about such lenses: 

 Canon EF 75–300mm lens
 Minolta AF 75-300mm f/4.5-5.6 lens